Arjunesvara Siva Temple is a 12th Century A.D. temple in Bhubaneswar, in the state of Orissa, India. The temple is situated on the southern embankment of the Bindusagar tank at a distance of 70 metres and situated on the right side of the ratha road branching from the road leading from Lingaraja temple to Ramesvara temple. The temple is facing towards west.

Currently the temple is abandoned and showing signs of deterioration.

History 
Architectural features like saptaratha on plan suggests that this temple was built in the 12th-13th Century A.D.

Physical description 
The temple is situated behind the temple of Bhabani Sankara and in the south-east corner of the Sari deul which is an ASI protected monument. It is facing towards west.

Architectural features 
The temple is constructed in the Kalingan style using grey sandstone and dry masonry construction technique. The main temple is a Rekha Deul. On plan, the temple has a square vimana measuring 3.50 square metres with a renovated frontal porch of 0.80 metres. The vimana is saptaratha with seven offset projections on each wall as distinguished by a central raha and a pair of anuraha, anuratha and kanika pagas on the either sides. The cella measures 1.50 square metres. On elevation, the vimana is of rekha order that measures 6.20 metres from bottom to the top. The temple has usual bada and gandi with mastaka missing. With threefold divisions
of the bada the temple has a panchaga bada measuring 2.20 metres in height. At the bottom the pabhaga measures 0.52 metres, tala jangha 0.46 metres, bandhana 0.20 metres, upara jangha 0.40 metres and baranda with a set of five mouldings measures 0.56 metres in height. Gandi measures 4.00 metres in height and is completely devoid of any decoration.

The raha niches on three sides uniformly measures 0.55 metres in height x 0.30 metres in width x 0.15 metres in depth are all empty. However, on both sides the niches are decorated with scroll works.

Decorative features 
Above the doorjambs there is a Sukanasa which is designed after a Khakhara mundi flanked by two miniature rekha deulas. Up to the Gandi portion the temple is carved with series of khakhara mundis inserted in every paga. The jangha portion is decorated with series of stylised chaitya motif and bada is relieved with scroll works. Doorjambs: The doorjambs measuring 1.40 metres in height and 0.95 metres in width is decorated with three plain vertical bands. The lintel is plain.

Present condition
The temple is showing signs of deterioration and in a rapid process of decay due to the growth of vegetation on the exterior walls. Since there is no mastaka rain water directly enters inside the sanctum. As it is not a living temple, the local people use the monument as a public toilet. The temple was repaired by Orissa State Archaeology under X and XI Finance Commission Award.

References 
 Pradhan, Sadasiba (2009). Lesser Known Monuments Of Bhubaneswar. Bhubaneswar: Lark Books. pp. 1–2. .
 Indira Gandhi National Centre For The Arts: Archaeological sites of Orissa

Hindu temples in Bhubaneswar